Lonnie Reed (born January 30, 1945) is an American politician who served in the Connecticut House of Representatives from the 102nd district from 2009 to 2019.

References

1945 births
Living people
Democratic Party members of the Connecticut House of Representatives